James Currey is a former academic publisher specialising in African Studies which since 2008 has been an imprint of Boydell & Brewer. It is named after its founder who established the company in 1984. It publishes on a full spectrum of topics—including anthropology, archaeology, history, politics, economics, development studies, gender studies, literature, theatre, film studies, and the humanities and social sciences generally—and its authors include leading names such as Bethwell Ogot and Ngũgĩ wa Thiong'o.

History 
Named after its founder, the company was established in 1984 when James Currey, originally from South Africa, left his position at Heinemann Educational Books to set up an Africa-focused publisher. At Heinemann, working with Chinua Achebe, Currey had spent more than a decade pioneering Heinemann's African Writers Series (AWS), the set of volumes that was a crucial factor in expanding the reach of African literature after World War II, particularly in English.

Currey cut his publishing teeth at the Cape Town outpost of Oxford University Press, as well as by spending time moonlighting for The New African, a liberal publication he followed into exile in London when it was stamped on by the Apartheid authorities in 1964.

In 1986, speaking at a Royal African Society symposium on the state of publishing in Africa, Currey described what he called "an academic book famine", down in part to the profit-driven reaction of the head offices of the big publishing houses, such as Heinemann and Longman, to negative economic developments on the continent during previous years. Currey spoke with pride of how small publishers like the James Currey imprint were the ones who picked up the slack as best they were able. To ensure high quality and global reach, while maintaining accessibility for African students, he said:

As will be familiar to readers of its East African Studies series, for example, that James Currey has had just such a long-running three-continent effort shared between itself, Heinemann Kenya, and Ohio University Press. This co-publishing approach has continued since 2008, when James Currey became an imprint of Boydell & Brewer.

Legacy 

The James Currey Collection at the University of Oxford's St Cross College was formally opened on 2 March 2019 at an event featuring the launch of Tsehai Berhane-Selassie's new book on Ethiopian Warriorhood, a lecture by author and Fellow of St Cross, Richard Reid, and a discussion by panellists including key African women publishers Ellah Wakatama Allfrey, Bibi Bakare-Yusuf, Margaret Busby, Nana Ayebia Clarke and Zaahida Nabagereka.

The James Currey Prize for African Literature was announced in 2020, established by Nigerian writer, filmmaker and publisher Onyeka Nwelue, to be awarded annually for the best-unpublished work of fiction written in English, set in Africa, or about Africans in the African continent or diaspora. The winner of the inaugural prize was Ani Kayode Somtochukwu. James Currey Society, also established by Nwelue, administers the James Currey Prize for African Literature and the James Currey Fellowship in cooperation with African Studies Centre, at the University of Oxford.

The inaugural James Currey Literary Festival took place from 1 September to 3 September at the Weston Library in Oxford, under the auspices of the James Currey Society, with support from the British Council and other organizations. At the festival, the Pan African Writers \association (PAWA) bestowed the award of Grand Patron of the Arts on James Currey for his contribution to African Literature.

See also 
L'Harmattan

References

Further reading

External links 
 

Book publishing companies of England
Companies based in Suffolk
Publishing companies established in 1984
1984 establishments in England